Andrea Petkovic was the defender of title; however, she lost to Alizé Cornet in the second round.
Julia Görges won in the final 6–1, 6–4, against Timea Bacsinszky.

Seeds

Draw

Finals

Top half

Bottom half

References
Main Draw
Qualifying Draw

Singles
Gastein Ladies
Gast
Gast